Scorpiurus is a genus of flies in the family Dolichopodidae, endemic to New Zealand.

Species
Scorpiurus aenescens Parent, 1933
Scorpiurus aramoana Bickel & Kerr, 2018
Scorpiurus thorpei Masunaga, 2017

References

External links
 iNaturalist World Checklist

Hydrophorinae
Dolichopodidae genera
Diptera of New Zealand
Taxa named by Octave Parent
Endemic insects of New Zealand